Peter Knezic is a retired American soccer player who played professionally in the Major Indoor Soccer League, American Soccer League, United Soccer League and American Indoor Soccer League.  He coached at the professional, collegiate and youth soccer level where he is currently the coaching director at Milwaukee Kickers Soccer Club.

Youth
Knezic grew up in Cudahy, Wisconsin where in 1967 he began playing youth soccer with the Milwaukee Serbians.  He moved up the club ranks and eventually played for their senior team where he was part of three Wisconsin Major Division and two Wisconsin Challenge Cup championships.  He attended the University of Wisconsin–Milwaukee where he was a 1979 Honorable Mention (third team) All American soccer player.

Professional
In 1980, both the Chicago Sting of the North American Soccer League and the Chicago Horizons of the Major Indoor Soccer League drafted Knezic.  He signed with the Horizons and played one season with them before the team folded.  In 1982, he signed with the Oklahoma City Slickers of the American Soccer League.  He remained with the Slickers through the 1983 season.  When both the team and the league collapsed, he moved to the Oklahoma City Stampede of the newly established United Soccer League.  In 1985, he moved to the Tulsa Tornados, but the team and league collapsed six games into the season.  In the fall of 1985, he signed with the Milwaukee Wave of the American Indoor Soccer Association.  He was selected for the All Star game that season.  Knezic suffered from back problems during the 1986-1987 season and when not playing, served as the team's assistant coach and general manager for player personnel.  He continued to play for the Wave through the 1989-1990 season.  In March 1992, the Wave retired his playing number - #5.  In 1989, Knezic was hired to coach the UW–Milwaukee Panthers women's soccer team.  Over two seasons, he compiled a 17-17-4 record and resigned on March 13, 1991.  He was inducted into the Wisconsin Soccer Hall of Fame in 2007.

References

External links

Chicago Sting stats

1959 births
Living people
American Indoor Soccer Association coaches
American Indoor Soccer Association players
American soccer coaches
American soccer players
American Soccer League (1933–1983) players
Chicago Horizons players
Chicago Sting (MISL) players
Major Indoor Soccer League (1978–1992) players
Milwaukee Wave players
Oklahoma City Slickers (ASL) players
Oklahoma City Stampede players
Tulsa Tornados players
United Soccer League (1984–85) players
Milwaukee Panthers men's soccer players
Soccer players from Wisconsin
Association football defenders
People from Cudahy, Wisconsin
Player-coaches
Association football midfielders